Storsjøen (or Storsjø) is the ninth-deepest lake in Norway at  in depth. The  lake lies in Rendalen and Åmot municipalities which are in Innlandet county, Norway.

Historically, the lake was used for floating timber downstream from the forests where it was cut to the downstream mills were it would be cut and sold.

See also
List of lakes in Norway

References

Åmot
Rendalen
Lakes of Innlandet